The 2006 Georgia gubernatorial election was held on November 7, 2006. Georgia incumbent Republican Governor Sonny Perdue ran for re-election to a second and final term as governor. Governor Perdue was renominated by the Republican Party, defeating a minor opponent in the process, while Lieutenant Governor Mark Taylor narrowly emerged victorious from a competitive Democratic primary. In the general election, though Taylor ran a spirited campaign, Perdue was aided by the increasing tendency of the state to vote for Republicans and by his popularity with the public; polling showed his approval ratings above sixty percent. In the end, Perdue was overwhelmingly re-elected as governor, defeating Taylor in a landslide.

Exit polls showed that Perdue won white voters (68% to 27%) while Taylor won black voters (81% to 17%). Perdue's 17% of the African-American vote was the highest showing of any Republican seeking statewide office in Georgia.

Democratic primary

Candidates
 Mark Taylor, Lieutenant Governor of Georgia
 Cathy Cox, Secretary of State of Georgia
 Bill Bolton
 Mac McCarley

Results

Republican primary

Candidates
 Sonny Perdue, incumbent Governor of Georgia
 Ray McBerry, businessman

Results

General election

Fundraising

Perdue had more financial resources on hand than Taylor.  As of the March 31 filing, Perdue reported that he had over $8 million on hand, while Taylor had $4.1 million in reserve.  Perdue had the added advantage of facing a weak opponent in Ray McBerry in the primary election, while Cox and Taylor engaged in a bitter struggle for the Democratic nomination. Hayes, the Libertarian candidate, reported less than $1,000 on hand, though the September 11 Zogby poll showed him attracting a surprising 8.1 percent of polled voters.

Advertisements

A minor controversy developed during the primary campaign over an ad created by Georgians for Truth, a group founded by several prominent Democratic fundraisers.  The ad criticized Perdue for allegedly failing to pay his taxes for several years before becoming governor, allegations that had been made in the 2002 campaign as well.  Cox and Taylor, for reasons that are not clear, requested that the group not run the ad, prompting the Georgia Democratic Party chairman, Bobby Kahn, to strongly rebuke the group's members.

Predictions

Campaign issues

Education
 The HOPE Scholarship program and its stability and continued solvency are recurring issues in Georgia politics.  Citing budget constraints, Perdue signed Republican-sponsored legislation that significantly cut the benefits conferred by the program.  Cox and Taylor both severely criticized the governor for these actions, and both pointed to the fact that Perdue voted against the legislation creating the program as a state senator in 1993.  Perdue backed an amendment to the state constitution that would have shifted the allocation of the lottery funds that support the program, but the legislation was defeated .

On April 19, 2006, Cox charged that Taylor had not sponsored the HOPE scholarship legislation in 1993, as he claimed.  Taylor apparently sponsored a companion bill that did not pass, although he supported the bill that did pass.  The incident portended a strongly negative campaign for the Democratic nomination.
 College Tuition may also be an issue.  During Perdue's first term, Georgia's universities substantially increased tuition fees.
 School funding: Perdue successfully backed legislation that requires Georgia schools to spend at least 65% of their budgets "in the classroom".  Democrats charged that some school programs, such as music classes, do not fit the definition of "in the classroom."

Health care

 Peachcare, a state program providing medical care for needy children and families, emerged as a point of contention between Perdue and his challengers.  Perdue approved a cut in the program during his administration.  Taylor, a strong supporter of the program, was particularly vocal in attacking Perdue and advocating significant expansion of the program.
 Medicaid: Perdue made Medicaid reform a priority during his first term.  Democrats were critical of the reform proposal that Perdue presented to federal officials.

Immigration

The problem presented by illegal immigrants emerged during Georgia's 2006 legislative session as an issue likely to have a large impact on the gubernatorial campaign.  Perdue signed legislation restricting the ability of illegal immigrants to access state resources, including health care and public education.

Voting

 Voter identification legislation signed by Perdue requiring photo identification for voting while expanding absentee voting opportunities had a substantial impact on the campaign.  Democrats strongly denounced the legislation as discriminatory against the poor and elderly, while Republicans attempted to alleviate such concerns by providing access to photo identification for those not possessing it.
 Paper ballots were a major concern of Taylor supporters, who felt that Cox made a mistake when she brought electronic voting to Georgia as secretary of state.

Polling

Results

See also 
 U.S. gubernatorial elections, 2006
 Governors of Georgia

References

External links
Official campaign websites (Archived)
 Perdue Re-Election Site
 Cox for Governor
 Taylor for Governor
 Hayes for Governor
 Bolton for Governor
 Dashler for Governor

Gubernatorial
2006
2006 United States gubernatorial elections